The Spellbinders were a New Jersey-based soul group comprising Bobby Shivers, Elouise Pennington, Dee Grant, Jimmy Wright and McArthur Munford.

Best known for their recordings with Van McCoy, Ken Williams and David Kapralik, The Spellbinders had moderate chart success in the US, Canada and the United Kingdom, with their first single "For You" reaching #23 in the US Billboard R & B charts and #93 in the Pop charts.

The band toured the US and Canada with acts like Arthur Conley, Joe Tex and Jackie Wilson, as well as the UK in 1965 and 1966, appearing at the legendary Northern Soul venue, the Manchester Twisted Wheel. Jimi Hendrix, who lived in London at the time, made the journey northwards to see them there. The group also appeared on Top of the Pops, a UK pop TV program. Their recordings "Chain Reaction" and "Help Me" are very popular on the UK Northern Soul scene.

The group split up in the late sixties and it was not until 2005 that Chris Lalor, a British citizen living in Belgium, contacted them to arrange a reunion. This resulted in The Spellbinders appearing at the New Jersey Soul Trip USA, organised by Kev Roberts.

Their only album The Magic Of The Spellbinders is considered by many soul fans to be one of the finest soul albums of the 1960s.

McArthur Munford died in September 2006 aged 63 and Dee Grant died in December 2007. Bobby Shivers owns the name Spellbinders and still performs with three backing singers in the US and the UK.

Selected discography

Notes

External links

American vocal groups